Michael Ford or Mike Ford is the name of:

Arts and entertainment
 Michael Ford (artist) (1920–2005), English artist
 Michael Ford (engraver) (died 1758), Irish engraver
 Michael C. Ford (born 1939), American poet, playwright, editor and recording artist
 Michael Curtis Ford, American historical novelist
 Michael D. Ford (1928–2018), English film set director
 Michael Thomas Ford (born 1968), American novelist
 Mike Ford (musician), Canadian singer-songwriter
 Mick Ford (born 1952), British actor and screenwriter
 John M. Ford (1957–2006), also known as Mike Ford, American science-fiction writer and game designer

Sports
 Michael Ford (gridiron football) (born 1990), American football running back
 Michael Ford (Australian footballer) (born 1962), former Australian rules footballer
 Mike Ford (footballer) (born 1966), English former footballer
 Mike Ford (ice hockey) (born 1952), Canadian former major league ice hockey player
 Mike Ford (NASCAR) (born 1970), American NASCAR Sprint Cup crew chief
 Mike Ford (rugby) (born 1965), English rugby coach and former rugby player
 Mike Ford (baseball) (born 1992), American baseball player
 Mike Ford (quarterback) (born 1959), American football quarterback, led NCAA in passing in 1978
 Mike Ford (cornerback) (born 1995), American football cornerback

Other
 C. Michael Ford, American businessman, activist
 Michael Gerald Ford (born 1950), son of former President of the United States Gerald Ford
 Michael Julius Ford (c. 1984–2006), American shooting spree killer
 Michael W. Ford (born 1976), American occultist, author, and musician
 Michael Ford (politician) (born 1994), Toronto councillor, nephew of former mayor of Toronto Rob Ford
 Mike Ford (architect), American architect
 Michael Ford, the main protagonist of the Conduit video game series